José Rafael Molina Ureña (April 30, 1921-May 22, 2000) was a president of the Dominican Republic. He served as provisional President of the Dominican Republic from 25 April to 27 April 1965. He was subsequently appointed Permanent Representative of the Dominican Republic to the United Nations from 1966 to 1968 and Ambassador to France from 1968 to 1971. 

He was married to Flor Pulgar, who became the First Lady of the Dominican Republic during Molina's three-day presidency.

References

1921 births
2000 deaths
20th-century Dominican Republic politicians
Presidents of the Dominican Republic
Dominican Republic rebels
Permanent Representatives of the Dominican Republic to the United Nations
Ambassadors of the Dominican Republic to France
People from Santo Domingo Province